The 2014 United States elections were held on Tuesday, November 4, 2014, in the middle of Democratic President Barack Obama's second term. Republicans retained control of the House of Representatives and won control of the Senate.

Republicans won a net gain of nine Senate seats, the largest Senate gain for either party since the 1980 United States elections. In the House, Republicans won a net gain of thirteen seats, giving them their largest majority since the 1928 elections. In state elections, Republicans won a net gain of two gubernatorial seats and flipped control of ten legislative chambers. Various other state, territorial, and local elections and referendums were held throughout the year. The election was commonly cited as a "Red wave" election.

With total spending reaching $3.7 billion, the midterm election, at the time, was the most expensive in history, being surpassed by the 2018 midterm election four years later. The 2014 election also saw the lowest turnout since 1942, with just 36.4% of eligible voters voting. Coupled with the 2010 midterms earlier in the Obama administration, this election marked the first time since the Reagan Administration that a two-term president's party suffered net losses in both houses of Congress in both midterm elections.

Issues
Major issues of the election included income inequality, and the Patient Protection and Affordable Care Act (commonly referred to as "Obamacare"), which Republicans sought to repeal. Democrats promoted their proposal to increase the minimum wage. In the weeks prior to the 2014 election, Republicans harshly criticized the Obama administration for its handling of the 2013-2016 ebola virus outbreak in Western Africa . However, immediately after the election, Republicans dropped Ebola as an issue. 2016 and 2020 studies found that Republican rhetoric on Ebola may have helped Republican candidates in the 2014 election.

Although it generated much debate in early 2014, the Keystone Pipeline ultimately received little attention in the election, with environmentalists instead focused on fighting global warming and supporting the EPA's proposed regulations on greenhouse gas emissions. Another potentially important issue, net neutrality, received little attention during the campaign.

National exit polling showed that 45% of voters said the economy was their most important issue. This was a decline from 2010 and 2008 (when 59% of voters and 63% of voters, respectively, named it as their top issue), but was still the most common issue cited by voters as most important to them. Smaller numbers of voters named health care, foreign policy, or illegal immigration as their top issues, or same-sex marriage, Ebola, or the legalization of marijuana as their top issues.

Federal elections

With a final total of 247 seats (56.78%) in the House and 54 seats in the Senate, the Republicans ultimately achieved their largest majority in the U.S. Congress since the 71st Congress in 1929.

Congressional elections

Senate elections

All 33 seats in Senate Class II were up for election. Additionally, three special elections were held to fill vacancies in Class III.

Of the 36 Senate races, the Republican Party won 24 (a net gain of nine seats, which represents the largest gain for a party in the Senate since 1980, and the largest Senate gain in a midterm since 1958) and the Democratic Party won 12, thus resulting in the Republicans regaining control of the Senate for the first time since 2006, with a total of 54 seats. The race in Louisiana headed to a run-off on December 6, 2014, in which Rep. Bill Cassidy (R) defeated 3-term incumbent Sen. Mary Landrieu 55.9% to 44.1%.

House of Representatives elections

All 435 voting seats in the United States House of Representatives were up for election. Elections were held to select the delegates for the District of Columbia and four of the five U.S. territories. The only seat in the House not up for election was the Resident Commissioner of Puerto Rico, who serves a four-year term. The Republican party won 247 seats (a net gain of 13 seats) and the Democratic Party, 188 seats. Thus, the Republicans gained their largest majority in the House since 1928. Nationwide, Republicans won the popular vote for the House of Representatives by a margin of 5.7 percent.

On March 11, there was a special election for Florida's 13th congressional district, won by the Republican Party.

State elections

Gubernatorial elections

Elections were held for the governorships of 36 U.S. states and three U.S. territories. The Republican Party won 24 of the 36 state governorships for a net gain of two seats, as they picked up open Democratic-held seats in Arkansas, Maryland and Massachusetts and defeated incumbent Governor Pat Quinn in Illinois, while Republican incumbents Tom Corbett of Pennsylvania and Sean Parnell of Alaska respectively lost to Democrat Tom Wolf and independent Bill Walker. This cycle marked the first time an incumbent Governor running for re-election in Pennsylvania lost in the modern era. The final total, as a result, was 31 Republican governors, 18 Democratic governors, and one Independent governor. In the table below, the US state governorships held by Democrats included: California, Colorado, Connecticut, Delaware, Hawaii, Kentucky, Minnesota, Missouri, Montana, New York, Oregon, Rhode Island, Virginia, Vermont, Washington, and West Virginia in addition to Washington, DC and Virgin Islands.

State legislative elections

Local elections
Numerous elections were held for officeholders in numerous cities, counties, school boards, special districts, and others around the country.

Mayoral elections
Major cities which held mayoral elections in 2014 include:
 Louisville, Kentucky: Incumbent Greg Fischer was re-elected to a second term.
 New Orleans, Louisiana: Incumbent Mitch Landrieu was re-elected to a second term on February 1.
 Newark, New Jersey: Acting mayor Luis A. Quintana, who took over on November 4, 2013, after Cory Booker resigned to become U.S. Senator, declined to run for a full term. Ras J. Baraka was elected as Newark's new mayor on May 13.
 Reno, Nevada: Incumbent Bob Cashell is term-limited out of office.
 San Diego, California: A special election was held on February 11 following the resignation of Bob Filner on August 30, 2013. Kevin Faulconer defeated David Alvarez to serve out the balance of Filner's term.
 San Jose, California: Incumbent Chuck Reed is term-limited out of office. A primary election was held on June 3, and a run-off was held on November 4. Sam Liccardo edged out opponent Dave Cortese in a razor-thin victory with 50.8% of the vote.
 Shreveport, Louisiana: Incumbent Cedric Glover is term-limited out of office.
 Washington, D.C.: Incumbent Vincent C. Gray was defeated in the Democratic primary on April 1 by Muriel Bowser. The general election was held on November 4 and Bowser was elected as mayor.

Turnout
Nationwide voter turnout was 36.4%, down from 40.9% in the 2010 midterms and the lowest since the 1942 elections, when just 33.9% of voters turned out, though that election came during the middle of World War II.

The states with the highest turnout were Maine (59.3%), Wisconsin (56.9%), Alaska (55.3%), Colorado (53%), Oregon (52.7%) Minnesota (51.3%), Iowa (50.6%), New Hampshire (48.8%), Montana (46.1%) and South Dakota (44.6%), all of which except for Iowa and Montana featured a competitive gubernatorial race and all of which except for Maine and Wisconsin also featured competitive Senate races. The states with the highest turnout that had no Senate or gubernatorial race that year were North Dakota (44.1%) and Washington state (38.6%).

The states with the lowest turnout were Indiana (28%), Texas (28.5%), Utah (28.8%), Tennessee (29.1%), New York (29.5%), Mississippi (29.7%), Oklahoma (29.8%), New Jersey (30.4%) and West Virginia and Nevada (31.8%). Indiana and Utah had no Senate or gubernatorial elections and the others all had races for at least one of the posts, but they were not considered competitive. Turnout in Washington, D.C. was (30.3%).

According to CNN, Americans aged between 18 and 29 accounted for 13% of voters, down from 19% in the presidential election two years before.

Analysis by the Pew Research Center found that 35% of non-voters cited work or school commitments, which prevented them from voting, 34% said they were too busy, unwell, away from home or forgot to vote, 20% either didn't like the choices, didn't know enough or didn't care and 10% had recently moved, missed a registration deadline or didn't have transportation.

The New York Times counts apathy, anger and frustration at the relentlessly negative tone of the campaigns as the reasons of low turnout and stated, "Neither party gave voters an affirmative reason to show up at the polls."

Controversies and other issues

Allegations of misconduct
Connecticut State Representative Christina Ayala (Democrat) was arrested in September 2014 on 19 voting fraud charges, specifically "eight counts of fraudulent voting, 10 counts of primary or enrollment violations and one count of tampering with or fabricating physical evidence." In September 2015 she pleaded guilty to state election law violations, received a one-year sentence (suspended) along with two years 'conditional discharge', and agreed not to seek elective office for two years. Her mother, Democratic Registrar of Voters Santa Ayala, was also the subject of an investigation in the case, but was not charged.

California State Senator Roderick Wright (Democrat) resigned from office in September 2014 and was sentenced to 90 days in Los Angeles county jail for perjury and voter fraud. Despite being convicted months earlier for 8 felonies, Wright was allowed to take a paid leave of absence as State Senator.

In Chicago, election judges said they had received automated phone calls between October–November 3 with apparently false instructions about voting or required training, according to the Chicago Sun-Times. In Pontiac, Michigan, local Democrats cited reports of voter harassment and intimidation by Republicans over questioning legally-cast ballots with election workers repeatedly having had to ask them to step aside. A clerk called police for help.

New voting restrictions
In June 2013, the Supreme Court invalidated part of the Voting Rights Act of 1965, permitting nine (mostly Southern) states to change their election laws without advance federal approval. Since 2010, 22 states enacted new voting restrictions. The 2014 federal election was the first federal election where 15 states enacted new voting restrictions, many of which faced challenges in court.

Voting machine issues
Scattered issues with voting machines occurred, with miscalibrated machines recorded a vote cast for one candidate as a vote for another candidate.  They occurred in Virginia, Maryland, Illinois, and North Carolina.

In Bexar County, Texas, the Republican candidate for governor, Greg Abbott, was accidentally replaced on the ballot by David Dewhurst on one machine, on which 12 votes were cast before the problem was caught.

Milestones
A series of milestones were set for women, African-Americans, and Hispanics, among others, in the U.S. Congress and American politics in general. These include:
 Republican Saira Blair, elected to the West Virginia House of Delegates, became the youngest elected official to state office in American history, at age 18.
 Republican Terry Branstad, the governor of Iowa, was re-elected to a sixth four-year term as governor, thus becoming the longest-serving governor in U.S. history (surpassing George Clinton of New York).
 Republican Shelley Moore Capito, elected to the Senate from West Virginia, became the first female senator in West Virginia's history.
 Republican Joni Ernst, elected to the Senate from Iowa, became the first female combat veteran elected to the U.S. Senate, the first woman ever elected on a statewide level in Iowa, and the first woman ever elected to the U.S. Congress from Iowa.
 Democrat Nellie Gorbea, elected Secretary of State of Rhode Island, became the first Hispanic to be elected to a statewide office in New England.
 Democrat Maura Healey, elected Massachusetts Attorney General, became the first openly gay state attorney general elected in America.
 Republican Will Hurd, elected to the House from Texas, was the first African-American Republican elected to Congress in Texas.
 Republican Mia Love, elected to the House from Utah, was the first African-American woman elected to Congress as a Republican, the first Haitian-American person elected to the U.S. Congress, and the first African-American elected to Congress from the state of Utah.
 Republican Martha McSally, the first American woman to fly in combat since the 1991 lifting of the prohibition of women in combat, as well as the first woman to command a USAF fighter squadron, was elected to the House from Arizona.
 Republican Alex Mooney, elected to the House from West Virginia, became the first Latino elected to Congress in West Virginia's history.
 Democrat Gina Raimondo, elected Governor of Rhode Island was the first woman elected governor in Rhode Island and first to restrict transportation related to a neighboring Democratic state (New York State). 
 Republican Tim Scott, elected to the Senate from South Carolina, was the first African-American in history to be popularly elected to the U.S. Senate in a former Confederate state, and also became the first African-American to be elected to both the House and the Senate.
 Republican Elise Stefanik, elected to the House from New York, was the youngest woman elected to Congress at age 30. She beat the previous record-holder and fellow New Yorker, Elizabeth Holtzman, who was elected at age 31 in 1972.
 Democrat Andrew M. Cuomo of New York was re-elected to a second term, bringing gubernatorial control of the NYS Governorś Office and to NYS Executive Budget to five terms by father Mario M. Cuomo and son Andrew M. Cuomo. Submitted by Julie Ann Racino, American Society for Public Administration, 2018

Table of federal and state results

Bold indicates a change in partisan control. Note that not all states held gubernatorial, state legislative, and United States Senate elections in 2014.

Viewership

Legend

Total television viewers10:00 PM Eastern

Television viewers 25 to 5410:00 PM Eastern

Total cable TV viewers8:00 to 11:00 PM Eastern

Cable TV viewers 25 to 548:00 to 11:00 PM Eastern

Source: adweek

Notes

References

External links

 
 

 
2014
2014
November 2014 events in the United States